Perhaps Love is a 2021 South Korean comedy-drama film, directed by Jo Eun-ji for Next Entertainment. Starring Ryu Seung-ryong, Oh Na-ra and Kim Hee-won, the film revolves around a best selling writer named Hyeon who's been in the slumps for 7 years. Then he meets an aspiring author Yoo-jin, who brings about change in his values.

It was released theatrically on November 17, 2021. On box office  it ranks 10th among the Korean films released in the year 2021 in South Korea, with gross of US$4.36 million and 514,260 cumulative admissions.

Cast
 Ryu Seung-ryong as Kim Hyeon, a best-selling author who has fallen into a slump
 Oh Na-ra as Mi-ae, Hyeon's ex-wife
 Kim Hee-won as Soon-mo, Hyeon's best friend and the head of a Sunmo publishing company 
 Lee Yoo-young as Jeong-won, Hyeon's neighbor
 Sung Yoo-bin as Kim Seong-kyeong, Hyeon and Mi-ae's son 
 Mu Jin-sung as Yoo-jin, an aspiring author
Cameo
 Oh Jeong-se as Nam-jin, an ex-best friend and rival writer of best-seller Hyeon
 Ryu Hyun-kyung as Hye-jin, Hyeon's current wife

Production 
Perhaps Love is the directorial debut of actress Jo Eun-ji. On May 2, 2019, it was revealed that Ryu Seung-ryong has been cast in upcoming comedy film tentatively titled as 'Not the Lips'.

Filming began on June 4, 2019,
and was wrapped up on September 13. The film was released 2 years after its completion.

Release
The film was released theatrically on November 17, 2021. In April 2022 the film was invited at the 24th edition of Far East Film Festival at Udine held from April 22 to 30 2022. In July 2022, it was invited at the 21st New York Asian Film Festival, where it was screened at Lincoln center on July 26.

Reception

Box office
The film was released on November 17, 2021, on 1192 screens. As per Korean Film Council (Kofic) integrated computer network, the film ranked first on the Korean box office in the opening weekend.

 it is at 10th place among all the Korean films released in the year 2021, with gross of US$4.36 million and 514,260 admissions.

Critical response
Bae Hyo-joo reviewing for Newsen praised performances of Ryu Seung-ryong, Oh Nara and Kim Hee-won and wrote, "Perhaps Love evokes sympathy and laughter from viewers. The actors' sincere acting, witty yet realistic dialogues and scenes, and witty directing bring about 100% pure pleasure in a long time."

Accolades

References

External links
 
 
 
 

2021 films
2020s Korean-language films
Films postponed due to the COVID-19 pandemic
South Korean comedy-drama films
South Korean LGBT-related films
LGBT-related comedy-drama films
Gay-related films
Films about divorce
Films about families
Films about writers
Films set in Seoul
Films set in Gangwon Province, South Korea
Films set in South Chungcheong Province
Films set in Lithuania
Films shot in South Korea
Films shot in Lithuania
2021 romance films
2021 directorial debut films
Next Entertainment World films